Virbia birchi is a moth in the family Erebidae. It was described by Herbert Druce in 1911. It is found in Trinidad and Colombia.

References

Moths described in 1911
birchi